Moraea tricolor is a species of plant in the family Iridaceae. It is found in Western Cape, South Africa.

References

External links

tricolor
Plants described in 1800
Taxa named by Henry Cranke Andrews